This is a summary of 1926 in music in the United Kingdom.

Events
 c. May – Socialist composer Rutland Boughton stages a performance of his Nativity opera Bethlehem (1915) at Church House, Westminster, in a staging explicitly referencing the 1926 United Kingdom general strike.
6 May – In the midst of the General Strike, a concert of Leos Janácek's work is held at the Wigmore Hall, attended by the composer himself.
20 October – Ethel Smyth's opera Entente Cordiale receives its first public stage performance in Bristol, having been premièred by students at the Royal College of Music the previous year.
November – Gertrude Lawrence becomes the first British performer to star in a US musical on Broadway, starring in Oh, Kay!.
8 December – The premiere of Dame Ethel Smyth's Sonata in A minor for cello and piano is held in London, nearly 40 years after the work was composed. 
14 December – The mother of teenage composer Benjamin Britten brings his work to the attention of Charles Macpherson.
17 December – Composer John Ireland marries Dorothy Phillips, thirty years his junior, at Chelsea Register Office. 
26 December – Granville Bantock's incidental music for Macbeth is used for the first time, in a production at the Prince Theatre, London, starring Sybil Thorndike.
date unknown 
Operatic baritone Leslie Rands marries his D'Oyly Carte co-star Marjorie Eyre.
Eugène Goossens, fils, joins the British National Opera Company as a conductor.
Sir Walford Davies resigns his professorship at University College, Aberystwyth.
The Webber Douglas School of Singing and Dramatic Art is founded by Walter Johnstone Douglas and Amherst Webber in London.
Organist and composer Herbert Brewer receives a knighthood.

Popular music
Eric Coates – "By The Tamarisk"

Classical music: new works
 Arnold Bax – Symphony No. 2 in E minor and C major
 Rutland Boughton – The Queen of Cornwall, overture
 John Ireland – Three Songs, 1926
 Ralph Vaughan Williams 
On Christmas Night (ballet)
Piano Concerto in C (movements 1 and 2)
Six Studies in English Folk Song
 Gerald Tyrwhitt – The Triumph of Neptune (ballet)
 Peter Warlock – Capriol Suite

Opera
Ernest Bryson – The Leper’s Flute, with libretto by Ian Colvin

Musical theatre
May – Yvonne by Percy Greenbank, Jean Gilbert and Vernon Dukelsky, opens at Daly's Theatre, London.

Births
3 January – Sir George Martin, record producer (died 2016)
21 January – Brian Brockless, organist, composer, and conductor (died 1995)
11 February – Alexander Gibson, conductor and founder of the Scottish Opera (died 1995)
20 February – Gillian Lynne, choreographer (died 2018)
14 March – Lita Roza, singer (died 2006)
 May — Duncan Campbell, trumpeter
2 July – Morag Beaton, operatic soprano (died 2010)
18 July – Bryan Johnson, singer (died 1995)
17 August – George Melly, jazz singer (died 2007)
17 November – Robert Earl, singer
30 December – Stan Tracey, jazz pianist and composer (died 2013)

Deaths
8 June – John Hornsey Casson, hymn-tune composer, 82
12 July – Charles Wood, composer, 60
2 November – John Le Hay, Irish-born musical comedy performer, 72
4 November – Robert Newman, co-founder of the Proms, 68

See also
 1926 in the United Kingdom
 List of British films of 1926

References

British Music, 1926 in
Music
British music by year
1920s in British music